Naked Sun may refer to:

Naked Sun (film), a 1958 Japanese film
The Naked Sun, a 1957 novel by Isaac Asimov
"The Naked Sun" (song), by Pandora, 1995
"Naked Sun", a song by ...And You Will Know Us by the Trail of Dead from So Divided, 2006

See also
"Naked Son", a song by Kip Winger from This Conversation Seems Like a Dream, 1996